Anton of Schauenburg (died 1558) was Archbishop-Elector of Cologne from 1557 to 1558.

Biography
Anton of Schauenburg was the son of Jobst I, Count of Holstein-Schauenburg and his wife Mary of Nassau-Siegen.

His elder brother Adolf III of Schauenburg was his predecessor as Archbishop of Cologne (1547-1556).
On 26 October 1557 the cathedral chapter of Cologne Cathedral elected Anton to be the new Archbishop of Cologne.  This election was confirmed by Pope Paul IV on October 1557. Anton was never ordained as a priest or as a bishop, and had only achieved the clerical rank of subdeacon at the time of his death. He spent the bulk of his time as Archbishop attempting to improve the disastrous financial situation of the archbishopric.

Anton died in June 1558. Cornelis Floris de Vriendt created matching tombs for Anton and his brother Adolf in Cologne Cathedral. Originally located in the choir, they were relocated to the apse chapels in 1863.  Anton's is in the west end of the Engelbert Chapel.

References
This page is based on this page on German Wikipedia.

External links
Anton's Tomb at Cologne Cathedral

1558 deaths
Anthony 01
Canons (priests)
Anthony 01
Anthony 01
Year of birth unknown
Sons of monarchs